Tanhum Cohen-Mintz (תנחום (תני) כהן-מינץ; also "Tanchum or Tani" and "Cohen-Minz"; October 18, 1939 – October 11, 2014) was an Israeli professional basketball player.  He was 6'8 " (2.04 m ) tall, and he played at the center position.

Early life
Cohen-Mintz, who was Jewish, was born in Riga, Latvia.

Basketball career

Cohen-Mintz started his sporting career in tennis, following the footsteps of his mother, Edith Cohen-Mintz, who was Israel's women's tennis champion for several years in the 1950s. He himself was Israel's junior tennis champion. He was viewed on the tennis court by legendary basketball coach Yehoshua Rozin, who was impressed by his height and athletic abilities. Rozin convinced Cohen-Mintz to convert to basketball.

During his club basketball career, he played with Maccabi Tel Aviv. He was a starting-five member of the 1964 and 1965 FIBA European Selection All-Star Teams.

He also played with, and was the captain of the senior Israeli national basketball team, representing it 89 times, from 1958–1971, during which time he scored 1,076 points.  

In 1961, he was selected as Israel's Sportsman of the Year.  In 1998, Ma'ariv named him one of the five best basketball players in Israel's history.

Hall of Fame

According to some sources, Tanhum Cohen Mintz is a member of the Jewish Sports Hall of Fame, having been inducted in 1992, but his name appears neither in the list of the International Jewish Sports Hall of Fame inductees nor in the list of the National Jewish Sports Hall of Fame inductees.

Personal life
His son, Uri Cohen-Mintz, is also a former basketball player, and he also played for Israel's national team.

Death
Cohen-Mintz died October 11, 2014, at the age of 75, of cancer.

References

External links
FIBA bio

1939 births
2014 deaths
Asian Games medalists in basketball
Basketball players at the 1966 Asian Games
Basketball players at the 1970 Asian Games
Centers (basketball)
Israeli men's basketball players
Israeli people of Latvian-Jewish descent
Jewish men's basketball players
Jewish Israeli sportspeople
Latvian men's basketball players
Latvian emigrants to Israel
Latvian Jews
Maccabi Tel Aviv B.C. players
Basketball players from Riga
Asian Games gold medalists for Israel
Asian Games silver medalists for Israel
Medalists at the 1966 Asian Games
Medalists at the 1970 Asian Games
Deaths from cancer in Israel
Burials at Kiryat Shaul Cemetery